Sátoraljaújhely is a district in north-eastern part of Borsod-Abaúj-Zemplén County. Sátoraljaújhely is also the name of the town where the district seat is found. The district is located in the Northern Hungary Statistical Region.

Geography 
Sátoraljaújhely District borders with the Slovakian region of Košice to the northeast, Cigánd District and Sárospatak District to the south, Gönc District to the west. The number of the inhabited places in Sátoraljaújhely District is 21.

Municipalities 
The district has 2 towns and 19 villages.
(ordered by population, as of 1 January 2012)

The bolded municipalities are cities.

Demographics

In 2011, it had a population of 23,058 and the population density was 72/km².

Ethnicity
Besides the Hungarian majority, the main minorities are the Roma (approx. 3,000), Slovak (800), German (200) and Rusyn (150).

Total population (2011 census): 23,058
Ethnic groups (2011 census): Identified themselves: 24,811 persons:
Hungarians: 20,723 (83.52%)
Gypsies: 2,780 (11.20%)
Slovaks: 784 (3.16%)
Others and indefinable: 524 (2.11%)
Approx. 2,000 persons in Sátoraljaújhely District did declare more than one ethnic group at the 2011 census.

Religion
Religious adherence in the county according to 2011 census:

Catholic – 11,135 (Roman Catholic – 8,372; Greek Catholic – 2,762); 
Reformed – 4,885;
Evangelical – 45;
other religions – 372; 
Non-religious – 2,001; 
Atheism – 106;
Undeclared – 4,514.

Gallery

See also
List of cities and towns of Hungary

References

External links
 Postal codes of the Sátoraljaújhely District

Districts in Borsod-Abaúj-Zemplén County